Patrick Esposito Di Napoli (January 18, 1964 – November 13, 1994) was a musician and member of the Quebec musical band Les Colocs, for which he played harmonica.

Early life and education
Di Napoli was born to a family of Italian descent in Perpignan, in the Pyrénées-Orientales département in France.

Career
He started making music in the 1970s, sometimes writing his own lyrics and melodies. For a time he lived with other musicians in an artist's loft in Montreal.

Di Napoli wrote the song "Séropositif Boogie", which appeared on the band's first album in 1993, about living with HIV. He had contracted the virus from a tainted needle. He died on November 13, 1994, of complications from AIDS.

Les Colocs paid homage to him by using pictures of him during live shows.  They dedicated their final album, Dehors novembre (November Begone) (1998), to Di Napoli. It is considered their best album. The title track, written by lead singer Dédé Fortin, expressed the point of view of a dying man, and was later used as the soundtrack to Patrick Bouchard's animated short film Dehors novembre.

See also
List of Quebec musicians
Music of Quebec
Culture of Quebec

References 

1964 births
1994 deaths
AIDS-related deaths in Canada
People from Perpignan
Musicians from Quebec
Canadian harmonica players
Canadian people of Italian descent
20th-century Canadian male musicians
Les Colocs members